Touch It may refer to:

Music 
"Touch It" (Busta Rhymes song), a song by Busta Rhymes, 2005
"Touch It" (Monifah song), a song by Monifah, 1998
"Touch It", a song by Ariana Grande from Dangerous Woman, 2016
"Touch It", a song by Exo from The War, 2017
"Touch It", a song by The Vindictives, 2012
Touch It, comedy album by Raymond and Scum, 2003